Stefan Meller  (4 July 1942 in Lyon, France – 4 February 2008 in Warsaw, Poland) was a Polish diplomat and academician. He served as foreign minister of Poland from 31 October 2005, to 9 May 2006, in the cabinet of Kazimierz Marcinkiewicz.

He was born to a Jewish family. Meller was a graduate from the faculty of history of the University of Warsaw. He was a Humanities professor until he was employed by the Polish Institute of International Affairs. He was also an editor-in-chief of a Polish monthly magazine "Mówią Wieki". From 1974 to 1992 he worked at the University of Warsaw and State Higher School of Drama and School of Social Sciences in Warsaw. He was previously the ambassador to France and Russia.

He resigned from the position of a minister after Law and Justice made coalition with Samoobrona, and Samoobrona's leader, Andrzej Lepper. Meller said "I am not going to be the clown at Andrzej I's court". One of his sons – Marcin Meller was the editor-in-chief of the Polish edition of Playboy magazine.

External links
BBC report on Meller resignation

1942 births
2008 deaths
Ambassadors of Poland to France
Ambassadors of Poland to Russia
Diplomats from Lyon
Polish people of Jewish descent
Polish United Workers' Party members
Ministers of Foreign Affairs of Poland
Academic staff of the University of Białystok